The Wild and the Free is a 1980 American family adventure comedy television film directed by James Hill and starring Granville Van Dusen, Linda Gray, Frank Logan, Raymond Forchion, Sharon Anderson, and Bill Gribble. It was broadcast on CBS as The CBS Wednesday Night Movie on November 26, 1980.

Plot

Cast
Granville Van Dusen as Raif
Linda Gray as Linda
Frank Logan as Serre
Raymond Forchion as Habibu
Sharon Anderson as Lakelea
Bill Gribble as Peter
Joan Murphy as Rose Bower
Bruce McLaughlin as Dean Anderson
Fred Buch as Palmer
Walter Zukovski as Walter O'Neill
Jack McDermott as Barton
Shelley Spurlock as Secretary
Kevan North as Kevin Bower
Sean Cunningham as 1st Boy
Teddy Milford as 2nd Boy
Bernard Ivey as 1st European
Rick Rhodes as 2nd European
Scott Earick as Poacher

References

External links

1980s English-language films
1980 television films
1980 films
1980s adventure comedy films
CBS network films